Marusk (also Romanized as Mārūsk; also known as Mārūsh) is a village in Binalud Rural District, in the Central District of Nishapur County, Razavi Khorasan Province, Iran. At the 2006 census, its population was 394, in 103 families.

References 

Populated places in Nishapur County